Michael Anthony Scott (born March 13, 1986) is an American former professional basketball player.

College career
Scott played 4 seasons of college basketball at the Kent State University from 2004 to 2008.

Professional career
Scott went undrafted in the 2008 NBA draft. For the 2008–09 season he signed with Trabzonspor Basketball of the Turkish Basketball Second League.

For the 2009–10 season he signed with BC Körmend of Hungary. In September 2010, he signed with BG Göttingen of Germany for the 2010–11 season.

On October 27, 2011, he signed with Radnički Kragujevac of Serbia for the 2011–12 season. In 33 games of Adriatic League, he averaged 17.5 points and 6.6 rebounds per game.

On August 15, 2012, he signed with Spirou Charleroi of Belgium. However, he left Charleroi after playing only four games in Belgian League, and returned to Serbia to sign with Crvena zvezda for the rest of the 2012–13 season. With Zvezda he won the Serbian Cup in 2013.

On August 9, 2013, he signed with Élan Béarnais Pau-Orthez of France for the 2013–14 season. He parted ways with Pau-Orthez on December 5, 2013. In 5 games of the LNB Pro A he averaged 3.6 points and 2.8 rebounds per game.

References

External links
 Adriatic League profile 
 Eurobasket.com profile 
 EuroCup profile

1986 births
Living people
ABA League players
African-American basketball players
American expatriate basketball people in Belgium
American expatriate basketball people in France
American expatriate basketball people in Germany
American expatriate basketball people in Hungary
American expatriate basketball people in Serbia
American expatriate basketball people in Turkey
Basketball League of Serbia players
Basketball players from Indianapolis
BC Körmend players
BG Göttingen players
Élan Béarnais players
Kent State Golden Flashes men's basketball players
KK Crvena zvezda players
KK Radnički Kragujevac (2009–2014) players
Small forwards
Spirou Charleroi players
Trabzonspor B.K. players
American men's basketball players
21st-century African-American sportspeople
20th-century African-American people